The Launceston Courier was a weekly newspaper published in Launceston, Tasmania, from 12 October 1840 to 20 March 1843.

History
The paper was established by John Knight (c. 1800 – 7 December 1860) of Carr Villa, Launceston, who was also a partner with John Pascoe Fawkner and Henry Dowling in the Launceston Advertiser (1829–1846), selling his interest to Benard Charles Jolly in September 1843.

In its final year it incorporated a section Launceston Courier and Teetotal Advocate.

Not to be confused with the Weekly Courier, published in Launceston 1901–1935 by the company whose Examiner continues to this day.

Trove
The Launceston Courier has been digitized by the National Library of Australia and may be accessed via Trove.

The Teetotal Advocate

See also
List of newspapers in Tasmania

References 

Defunct newspapers published in Tasmania
Newspapers established in 1840
Publications disestablished in 1843
Launceston, Tasmania
1840 establishments in Australia
1843 disestablishments in Australia